The 2009 Dally M Awards were presented on Tuesday 8 September 2009 at the State Theatre in Sydney and broadcast on Fox Sports.

Dally M Medal-Player of the Year
Presented by the Prime Minister of Australia, Kevin Rudd
Dally M Player of the Year
Winner:
Jarryd Hayne, Parramatta Eels

Player votes tally (top 10)

Dally M Awards
The Dally M Awards were, as usual, conducted at the close of the regular season and hence do not take games played in the finals series into account. The Dally M Medal is for the official player of the year while the Provan-Summons Medal is for the fans' of "people's choice" player of the year.

Team of the Year

See also
Dally M Awards
Dally M Medal
National Rugby League season 2009

References

Dally M Awards
Dally M Awards
Dally M Awards